Timia erythrocephala is a species of ulidiid or picture-winged fly in the genus Timia of the family Ulidiidae. It is the type species of the genus Timia.

References

Ulidiidae
Insects described in 1824